Wełnowiec-Józefowiec is a district of Katowice. It has an area of 3.15 km2 and in 2007 had 15.924 inhabitants.

The district consists of two historical settlements: 
 Wełnowiec, first mentioned in the 17th century, initially a hamlet of Bogucice; before 1922 also known as Hohenlohehütte, after a local steel mill;
 Józefowiec, established in 1826 by rev. Józef Beder, a Catholic priest from Chorzów;

References

Districts of Katowice